Phonetic Extensions is a Unicode block containing phonetic characters used in the Uralic Phonetic Alphabet, Old Irish phonetic notation, the Oxford English dictionary and American dictionaries, and Americanist and Russianist phonetic notations. Its character set is continued in the following Unicode block, Phonetic Extensions Supplement.

Block

History
The following Unicode-related documents record the purpose and process of defining specific characters in the Phonetic Extensions block:

See also 
 Cyrillic script in Unicode
 Greek alphabet in Unicode
 Latin script in Unicode

References 

Unicode blocks